Peter Christiansen may refer to:

Peter Christiansen (footballer, born 1975), Danish footballer
Peter Christiansen (footballer, born 1999), Danish footballer
Peter Christiansen (rower) (born 1941), Danish rower

See also
Peter Christensen (disambiguation)